This is a list of the leaders of the opposition party at the Montreal City Hall.  Party colours do not indicate affiliation or resemblance to a provincial or a federal party.

Footnotes

See also
 List of mayors of Montreal
 Montreal City Council
 History of Quebec

Montreal
Municipal government of Montreal
Official Opposition
Lists of leaders of the Opposition
Opposition